Summit Township is one of seventeen townships in Adair County, Iowa, USA.  At the 2010 census, its population was 967.

History
Summit Township was organized in 1871. Summit is named from the ridge it contains that forms the watershed between the Mississippi and Missouri rivers.

Geography
According to the USGS, it contains two cemeteries: Saint Johns and Sunny Hill.

References

External links
 US-Counties.com
 City-Data.com

Townships in Adair County, Iowa
Townships in Iowa
1871 establishments in Iowa
Populated places established in 1871